Faraldo is a surname. Notable people with the surname include:

Claude Faraldo (1936–2008), French actor
Dan-e-o (birthname Daniel Faraldo, born 1977), Canadian hip hop artist
Danielle Faraldo (born 1966), American filmmaker
Francesco Faraldo (born 1982), Italian judoka
Toto Faraldo, dancer of Salon tango